A constitutional referendum was held in French Sudan and Niger on 13 October 1946 as part of the wider French constitutional referendum. The proposed new constitution was rejected by 45% of voters in the two territories, but approved by 57.4% of the overall vote. Voter turnout was 51%.

Results

References

1946 referendums
October 1946 events in Africa
Referendums in Mali
1946 in French Sudan
Referendums in Niger
1946 in Niger